David A. Russell (born 6 November 1957) is a retired English professional golfer who played on the European Tour between 1978 and 1996 and then briefly on the European Seniors Tour in 2008.

Career
Russell was born in Dartford, England, and turned professional in 1976. That autumn he went to the first Qualifying school held at Walton Heath. He was the medalist with a score of 296.

Russell played on the European Tour and Challenge Tour. His best finish on the European Tour was second place at the 1987 KLM Dutch Open. He won one event on the Challenge Tour, the 1997 Audi Quattro Trophy. In 1992, he suffered a hand injury that kept him out for eight months. He led the 1993 Heineken Dutch Open at one stage, but eventually finished 19th, two shots over par.

Russell played in The Open Championship seven times, making the cut four times, tied for 44th in 1985, T-38 in 1988, T-67 in 1996, and T-24 in 1997.

In 1994, Russell played ten events of the PGA Tour making the cut in three.

Personal life
Russell is married, and he and his wife Sharon have had two children, both girls.

Professional wins (1)

Challenge Tour wins (1)

Results in major championships

Note: Russell only played in The Open Championship.

CUT = missed the half-way cut (3rd round cut in 1984 Open Championship)
"T" = tied

References

External links

English male golfers
European Tour golfers
Sportspeople from Dartford
Sportspeople from Gravesend, Kent
1957 births
Living people